Per Vidar Barth Lilje (born 11 March 1957) is a Norwegian astronomer.

He was born in Tønsberg. He took his Ph.D. at the University of Cambridge in 1988, and worked at the Nordic Institute for Theoretical Physics from 1989 to 1992. He became professor at the University of Oslo in 1993, and since 2005 he heads the Institute of Theoretical Astrophysics there. His fields are cosmology and extragalactic astronomy. In 2017 he was inducted into the Norwegian Academy of Science and Letters.

References

External links 
 

1957 births
Living people
People from Tønsberg
Alumni of the University of Cambridge
Norwegian astronomers
Academic staff of the University of Oslo
Members of the Norwegian Academy of Science and Letters